Dayane Pires da Rocha (born 24 March 1991) is a Brazilian handball player for Molde Elite and the Brazilian national team.

She has played in the 2010 Women's Junior World Handball Championship, and in the 2012 Summer Olympics.

Titles
Pan American Women's Club Handball Championship:
2016

Individual awards and achievements

Best left wing
2016 Pan American Women's Club Handball Championship

References

1991 births
Living people
Brazilian female handball players
Expatriate handball players
Brazilian expatriate sportspeople in North Macedonia
South American Games gold medalists for Brazil
South American Games medalists in handball
Competitors at the 2018 South American Games
Handball players at the 2020 Summer Olympics
21st-century Brazilian women